Requiem is a classical work by Karl Jenkins, first recorded and performed in 2005.  It was premièred at Southwark Cathedral on 2 June 2005, by the West Kazakhstan Philharmonic Orchestra and Adiemus percussion and brass, conducted by the composer.  Soloists were Nicole Tibbels (soprano), Clive Bell (shakuhachi), Sam Landman (treble) and Catrin Finch (harp).

In this work, Jenkins interjects movements featuring Japanese death poems in the form of a haiku with those traditionally encountered in a Requiem Mass. At times, the Latin text is sung below the text of the haiku. Oriental instruments are included in the orchestration, such as the shakuhachi, the darabuca, daiko and frame drums.

The work was released in a 2005 album of the same name.

Album

Requiem was included on Jenkins' 2005 album of the same name: Requiem. Along with his work In These Stones Horizons Sing, it was written for the opening ceremony of the Wales Millennium Centre in Cardiff. Contributors to the album included the West Kazakhstan Philharmonic Orchestra, Clive Bell (on shakuhachi), Marat Bisengaliev (as solo violinist) Catrin Finch (harp), and Nigel Hitchcock (soprano saxophone).

Album track listing
 Requiem
"Introit" – 6:49
"Dies Irae" – 4:41
"The Snow of Yesterday" – 3:15
"Rex Tremendae" – 3:10
"Confutatis" – 2:56
"From Deep in My Heart" – 2:38
"Lacrimosa" – 4:51
"Now as a Spirit" – 4:01
"Pie Jesu" – 4:36
"Having Seen the Moon" – 4:19
"Lux Aeterna" – 3:27
"Farewell" – 4:05
"In Paradisum" – 5:37In These Stones Horizons Sing
"Agorawd Part I: Cân yr Alltud" – 2:34
"Agorawd Part II: Nawr!" – 2:41
"Grey" – 4:50
"Eleni Ganed" – 2:01
"In These Stones Horizons Sing" – 4:32

References

External links 
 Jenkins, Karl: Requiem (2004), Boosey & Hawkes
 Karl Jenkins, Interview on Requiem, karljenkins.com

Compositions by Karl Jenkins
Jenkins
2005 compositions